HMS Zubian was a First World War Royal Navy  destroyer constructed from the forward end of  and the rear and mid sections of . These two destroyers had been badly damaged in late 1916, and rather than scrapping both hulls at the height of World War I, the Admiralty ordered that they be rebuilt as the composite Zubian and put back into service. She was commissioned into the fleet in June 1917. The name Zubian is a portmanteau of the names of the original ships.

Zubian saw extensive service in the final two years of the war as part of the Dover Patrol. She sank the German U-boat  in February 1918, while she was on patrol in the English Channel. In late April, she participated in the First Ostend Raid as an escort for the bombardment force. After the war, Zubian was sold for scrap and broken up by December 1919.

Design

She displaced . The ship's propulsion system consisted of three Parsons steam turbines, which were powered by six oil-fired Thornycroft boilers. She was armed with two QF 4-inch Mk V guns and two 18-inch (450 mm) torpedo tubes. One gun was mounted on the forecastle and the other on the stern, with the two torpedo tubes amidships. Her crew numbered 68 officers and ratings.

Service history

In late 1916, two British destroyers of the 6th Flotilla in the Dover Patrol— and —were badly damaged by German attacks in the English Channel. Nubians bow had been destroyed by a torpedo from a German torpedo boat on 27 October in the Battle of Dover Strait, while Zulu had her stern blown off by a mine in the Channel on 8 November, and was towed to Calais. Both wrecks were then towed to Chatham Dockyard, where a complete destroyer was constructed by joining the foreparts of Zulu with the stern of Nubian, and despite a  difference in beam, the unique operation was successful. The ship was renamed Zubian by Admiral Reginald Bacon, the commander of the Dover Patrol. The hybrid destroyer was commissioned on 7 June 1917. The choice of name caused confusion among the German Imperial Admiralty Staff, who knew of no such ship under construction.

Zubian joined the 6th Flotilla and served there until the end of the war. During this period, Zubian and the rest of the Flotilla rotated through nighttime patrols of the Dover Strait in groups of four, supported by flotilla leaders; these patrols were intended to catch German torpedo boats that were conducting night bombardments of Allied positions in the Channel. Zubian attempted to ram the submarine but the Germans managed to submerge. The destroyer then dropped depth charges over the submerged U-boat and a significant amount of oil and wreckage was observed thereafter. Zubian marked the location with a buoy and an hour later, the patrol vessel  dropped additional depth charges there. Trawlers later located an object that divers confirmed was UC-50.

Zubian also participated in the First Ostend Raid two months later on the night of 23–24 April. The attack was intended to close the German-held ports of Ostend and Zeebrugge, which were being used as bases for the U-boats. The bombardment unit was covered by the Harwich Force in the Channel. The bombardment force was tasked with suppressing the German coastal defences, while a pair of old cruisers attempted to steam into the harbour entrances, where they would be sunk as blockships. The effort failed when both cruisers ran aground far outside of the harbour.

Worn out by heavy wartime use, Zubian was sold in the immediate post-war draw down and broken up for scrap by December 1919.

Footnotes

References

Further reading
 
 
 
 
 

 

Tribal-class destroyers (1905)
Ships built in Chatham
1917 ships
World War I destroyers of the United Kingdom
Royal Navy ship names